Stolen Youth is a collaborative mixtape by American rapper Vince Staples and rapper/producer Mac Miller, under his production pseudonym Larry Fisherman. The mixtape was released as a free digital download on June 20, 2013 to mixtape hosting websites. Stolen Youth was entirely produced by Miller. The mixtape features guest appearances from Mac Miller, Ab-Soul, Schoolboy Q, Da$H, Hardo, and Staples' Cutthroat Boyz cohort, Joey Fatts.

Background 
Vince Staples met Mac Miller through Earl Sweatshirt, after he had returned from Samoa. In December 2012, Mac Miller announced that he would be producing an Extended Play titled, Tales of a Stolen Youth by rapper Vince Staples. Staples stated Miller originally just gave him a few beats, but that grew into them deciding to release a full project together. On March 19, 2013, Staples revealed that Schoolboy Q, Ab-Soul and Joey Fatts would be featured on the project.

On April 12, 2013, the first single "Guns & Roses" was released via The FADER. The song features Staples discussing "sensitive issues as child abuse and gun violence, backed by the choral-sampled" production. On June 6, 2013, Staples revealed the track list to the mixtape. The project title would then be shortened to just Stolen Youth and would be released on June 20, 2013, just two days after Miller's second studio album Watching Movies with the Sound Off as a "free album" or mixtape. The mixtape featured guest appearances from Miller, Ab-Soul, Schoolboy Q, Da$h, Hardo, and Staples' Cutthroat Boyz cohort, Joey Fatts.

Following its release, Staples toured as a supporting act on every date of Mac Miller's The Space Migration Tour. Following the release of Stolen Youth he made three appearances on Earl Sweatshirt's debut studio album Doris, including the single "Hive". The liner notes of the album revealed that Vince Staples had recently signed to Def Jam Recordings. Shortly after the release of Stolen Youth he began working on his fourth mixtape Shyne Coldchain Vol. 2.

On December 5th, 2014 Amazon Music combined and reordered the tracks from Stolen Youth and Shyne Coldchain Vol. 2 and released them as an updated version of Stolen Youth (same name and artwork).

Reception 

Stolen Youth was met with acclaim  from music critics. Jesse Fairfax of HipHopDX labeled it a "free album", their highest praise for mixtape, saying "A breakout moment for both Vince Staples on the emcee front and Mac Miller behind the boards, Stolen Youth is the product of creative ambition and an organic, refreshing chemistry. Determined to make good on Mac’s charitable efforts, Vince spends the project channeling hopeless pessimism that doesn’t manage to distract from his lyrical gift." XXL called it a "trippy ride through the witty mind of the LA spitter", and praised the "dreamy, textured" production. In a positive review, Elijah Watson of Billboard said, " It's an uncomfortably numb LP: a dispirited Staples reminiscing his past, while ambivalently looking toward his future. [...] Production, handled by Mac Miller as Larry Fisherman, is warm and moody, fitting Staples' bleak outlook well. Black Hippy cohorts Ab-Soul and ScHoolboy Q make appearances, but for the most part Staples is on his own. "Stolen Youth" is an enjoyably dark listen, with Staples' nightmare-inducing wordplay skillful and engaging."

Track listing  
 All tracks are produced by Larry Fisherman

Notes
"Intro" features additional vocals by Mac Miller as Delusional Thomas

References 

2013 mixtape albums
Mac Miller albums
Albums produced by Mac Miller
Vince Staples albums